Sir Alexander Waldemar Lawrence, 4th Baronet (18 May 1874 – 1 September 1939) was a British solicitor and politician.

References

1874 births
1939 deaths
Baronets in the Baronetage of the United Kingdom
Liberal Party (UK) parliamentary candidates